Kullogum is a rural locality in the Bundaberg Region, Queensland, Australia.

History 
In 1877,  of land was resumed from the Kullugum pastoral run to establish smaller farms. The land was offered for selection on 17 April 1877.

References 

Bundaberg Region
Localities in Queensland